This article details the Bradford Bulls rugby league football club's 2002 season, the 7th season of the Super League era.

Season review

February 2002

As Bradford won the 2001 Super League Grand Final they had to play the winners of the 2001 NRL Grand Final. Newcastle Knights beat Parramatta Eels 30–24 and played the Bulls in the 2002 World Club Challenge. Bradford came away with a 41–22 victory over the Australian champions thanks to a Robbie Paul double and 2 tries from Michael Withers. Bradford were knocked out of the Challenge Cup by a Ben Walker inspired Leeds Rhinos. The Bulls succumbed to a 17–4 loss.

March 2002

The Bulls started off their Super League defence with a hard fought 18–4 win over last years runners up Wigan Warriors. Bradford backed this performance up with a 38–12 win over Warrington Wolves. The Bulls continued their good start to the season by beating Widnes Vikings 22–16. Once again the Bulls overcame the challenge set before them as they recorded 4 wins from 4 games by beating Hull F.C. 32–18.

April 2002

Bradford started April with a 44–12 win over Wakefield Trinity Wildcats. New signing Lesley Vainikolo scored 2 tries to help the Bulls to a victory. The Bulls suffered their first league defeat at the hands of London Broncos as they were beaten 15–14. Bradford soon got back to winning ways as they demolished St Helens R.F.C. 54–22 with Tevita Vaikona scoring a hat-trick. They backed up this fine form with a 44–18 win over Salford City Reds.

May 2002

The Bulls started May off with a hard fought 32–8 victory against Castleford Tigers. The good run came to an end at the hands of rivals Leeds Rhinos. The Rhinos beat Bradford 28–20 at Headingley Stadium. Bradford bounced back from this defeat to beat Halifax Blue Sox 46–22. The Bulls finished May with a hard fought 28–26 win against Wigan Warriors.

June 2002

Bradford started June with a great 40–12 victory over the Warrington Wolves. The Bulls continued their good run of form with a 22–12 win against London Broncos. Bradford then demolished Salford City Reds 48–10 to stay top of the league. Their good run came to an end as the Bulls went down 34–26 to St Helens R.F.C. at Knowsley Road.

July 2002

The Bulls got back to winning ways with a 44–6 win against Widnes Vikings. Bradford then followed this win with yet another victory as they beat Wakefield Trinity Wildcats 36–18. The Bulls continued this run of form with a hard fought 25–24 win at Hull F.C. with Michael Withers kicking the decisive drop goal. Bradford finished the month with a 40–18 win against Castleford Tigers.

August 2002

Bradford started August with a bang as they beat local rivals Leeds Rhinos for the first time this year, a Lesley Vainikolo double helped the Bulls to a 46–18 victory at Valley Parade. The Bulls continued this winning streak by beating Halifax Blue Sox 25–8. Bradford's 6 game winning run was brutally ended by St Helens R.F.C. as the Saints smashed the Bulls 50–22. For the first time this season the Bulls lost two games in a row as they went down 44–14 to Castleford Tigers.

September 2002

The Bulls got back to winning ways with a 46–14 win against London Broncos. Bradford backed this up with a 20–18 win against arch-rivals Leeds Rhinos. The Bulls also beat Wigan Warriors 32–14 however due to a lower points difference Bradford slipped down to 2nd in the table behind St Helens R.F.C. with one game to go. The Bulls finished the regular rounds with a 32–18 win over Hull F.C. however the margin of victory was not enough to claim top spot in the league and Bradford finished 2nd, they finished with 46 points (same as St Helens R.F.C.) but Saints had 14 points more in the points difference column.

October 2002

Bradford faced St Helens R.F.C. in the Qualifying Semi-final at Knowsley Road, the Bulls came out on top as they narrowly defeated the Saints 28–26 in a hard fought contest. In the Grand Final the Bulls lost 19–18 to St Helens R.F.C. however the final second of the game is subject to controversy as Saints captain Chris Joynt gave himself up in a voluntary tackle (a penalty should have gone to the Bulls for this action) in a kickable range which would have given Paul Deacon the chance to win the game 20–19.

2002 milestones

WCC: Paul Deacon reached 300 points for the Bulls.
WCC: Lesley Vainikolo scored his 1st try for the Bulls.
Round 2: Paul Anderson scored his 25th try and reached 100 points for the Bulls.
Round 2: Brandon Costin scored his 1st try for the Bulls.
Round 3: Paul Sykes kicked his 1st goal for the Bulls.
Round 7: Tevita Vaikona scored his 5th hat-trick for the Bulls.
Round 7: Robbie Paul became the 1st player to score 100 tries for the club and he also reached 400 points for the Bulls.
Round 9: Jamie Peacock scored his 25th try and reached 100 points for the Bulls.
Round 9: Paul Deacon reached 400 points for the Bulls.
Round 10: Stuart Fielden scored his 25th try and reached 100 points for the Bulls.
Round 13: Michael Withers scored his 75th try and reached 300 points for the Bulls.
Round 17: Paul Deacon kicked his 200th goal and reached 500 points for the Bulls.
Round 17: Michael Withers kicked his 1st goal for the Bulls.
Round 18: Robbie Paul kicked his 1st goal for the Bulls.
Round 20: Tevita Vaikona scored his 75th try and reached 300 points for the Bulls.
Round 22: Scott Naylor scored his 50th try and reached 200 points for the Bulls.
Round 24: Paul Deacon scored his 25th try for the Bulls.
Round 25: Nathan McAvoy scored his 50th try and reached 200 points for the Bulls.
Round 27: Paul Deacon reached 600 points for the Bulls.

Table

World Club Challenge

2002 fixtures and results

2002 Tetley's Super League

Challenge Cup

Playoffs

2002 squad statistics

 Appearances and Points include (Super League, Challenge Cup and Play-offs) as of 2012.

References

External links
Bradford Bulls Website
Bradford Bulls in T&A
Bradford Bulls on Sky Sports
Bradford on Super League Site
Red,Black And Amber
BBC Sport-Rugby League 

Bradford Bulls seasons
Bradford Bulls